Clifford is an unincorporated community in the Town of Minto in Wellington County in Southwestern Ontario, Canada. It is on Ontario Highway 9 and Coon Creek, a stream in the Saugeen River drainage basin.

The village of Clifford was founded around 1855 as Minto Village. After the opening of the post office in 1856, the settlement was renamed Clifford by the first postmaster Francis Brown after Clifford in West Yorkshire, England.  Clifford was incorporated as a village in 1873. In 1999, Clifford was amalgamated with Palmerston, Harriston and Minto Township to create Minto.

The first telephones in the community were installed in 1890 by Bell Canada. Wightman Telecom, based in Clifford and owned by the Wightman family, has owned and operated a communication system in Clifford since 1908, with a telephone system that was originally operated out of a kitchen in Howick Township. Wightman bought out Bell's operations in Clifford, Ayton and Neustadt in 1928. The firm continues to operate the system .

Demographics 

Notable people 
Famous people from Clifford include John A. Kruspe, a former CFL player. Kruspe was a member of the Ottawa Rough Riders during the 1973 Grey Cup win against the Edmonton Eskimos.

References

Other map sources:

External links
 

Communities in Wellington County, Ontario
Former villages in Ontario
Designated places in Ontario
Populated places disestablished in 1999